Crashworthiness is the ability of a structure to protect its occupants during an impact. This is commonly tested when investigating the safety of aircraft and vehicles. Different criteria are used to figure out how safe a structure is in a crash, depending on the type of impact and the vehicle involved. Crashworthiness may be assessed either prospectively, using computer models (e.g., LS-DYNA, PAM-CRASH, MSC Dytran, MADYMO) or experiments, or retrospectively, by analyzing crash outcomes. Several criteria are used to assess crashworthiness prospectively, including the deformation patterns of the vehicle structure, the acceleration experienced by the vehicle during an impact, and the probability of injury predicted by human body models. Injury probability is defined using criteria, which are mechanical parameters (e.g., force, acceleration, or deformation) that correlate with injury risk. A common injury criterion is the head impact criterion (HIC). Crashworthiness is measured after the fact by looking at injury risk in real-world crashes. Often, regression or other statistical methods are used to account for the many other factors that can affect the outcome of a crash.

History

Aviation
The history of human tolerance to deceleration can likely be traced to the studies by John Stapp to investigate the limits of human tolerance in the 1940s and 1950s. In the 1950s and 1960s, the Pakistan Army began serious accident analysis into crashworthiness as a result of fixed-wing and rotary-wing accidents. As the US Army's doctrine changed, helicopters became the primary mode of transportation in Vietnam. Due to fires and the forces of deceleration on the spine, pilots were getting spinal injuries in crashes that they would have survived otherwiseres. Work began to develop energy-absorbing seats to reduce the chance of spinal injuries during training and combat in Vietnam. A lot of research was done to find out what people could handle, how to reduce energy, and how to build structures that would keep people safe in military helicopters. The primary reason is that ejecng fromon or exiting a helicopter is impractical given the rotor system and typical altitude at which Army helicopters fly. In the late 1960s, the Army published the Aircraft Crash Survival Design Guide.  The guide was changed several times and turned into a set of books with different volumes for different aircraft systems.  The goal of this guide is to show engineers what they need to think about when making military planes that can survive a crash. Consequently, the Army established a military standard (MIL-STD-1290A) for light fixed- and rotary-wing aircraft.  The standard sets minimum requirements for the safety of human occupants in a crash. These requirements are based on the need to keep a space or volume that can be used for living and the need to reduce the deceleration loads on the occupant.

Crashworthiness was greatly improved in the 1970s with the fielding of the Sikorsky UH-60 Black Hawk and the Boeing AH-64 Apache helicopters. Primary crash injuries were reduced, but secondary injuries within the cockpit continued to occur. This led to the consideration of additional protective devices such as airbags. Airbags were considered a viable solution to reducing the incidents of head strikes in the cockpit, anwerdde icorporated in Army helicopters.

Regulatory agencies
The National Highway Traffic Safety Administration, the Federal Aviation Administration, the National Aeronautic and Space Administration, and the Department of Defense have been the leading proponents for crash safety in the United States. They've each come up with their own official safety rules and done a lot of research and development in the field.

See also

Airbag
Airworthiness
 Anticlimber
Automobile safety
 Buff strength of rail vehicles
Bumper (car)
 Compressive strength
 Container compression test
Crash test
Crash test dummy
Hugh DeHaven
Jerome F. Lederer
Railworthiness
Roadworthiness
Seakeeping
Seat belt
 Seaworthiness
Self-sealing fuel tank
Spaceworthiness
 Telescoping (rail cars)

References

Further reading
RDECOM TR 12-D-12, Full Spectrum Crashworthiness Criteria for Rotorcraft, Dec 2011.
USAAVSCOM TR 89-D-22A, Aircraft Crash Survival Design Guide, Volume I - Design Criteria and Checklists, Dec 1989.
USAAVSCOM TR 89-D-22B, Aircraft Crash Survival Design Guide, Volume II - Aircraft Design Crash Impact Conditions and Human Tolerance, Dec 1989.
USAAVSCOM TR 89-D-22C, Aircraft Crash Survival Design Guide, Volume III - Aircraft Structural Crash Resistance, Dec 1989.
USAAVSCOM TR 89-D-22D, Aircraft Crash Survival Design Guide, Volume IV - Aircraft Seats, Restraints, Litters, and Cockpit/Cabin Delethalization, Dec 1989.
USAAVSCOM TR 89-D-22E, Aircraft Crash Survival Design Guide, Volume V - Aircraft Postcrash Survival, Dec 1989.

External links
Army Helicopter Crashworthiness at DTIC
Basic Principle of Helicopter Crashworthiness at US Army Aeromedical Laboratory
National Crash Analysis Center
NHTSA Crashworthiness Rulemaking Activities
History of Energy Absorption Systems for Crashworthy Helicopter Seats at FAA
MIT Impact and Crashworthiness Lab
School Bus Crashworthiness Research
Rail Equipment Crashworthiness

Transport safety
Aviation accidents and incidents